Persatuan Sepakbola Indonesia Karawang, commonly known as Persika, is an Indonesian football club based in Karawang, Karawang Regency, West Java. The club plays in Liga 3.

References

External links
 
Premier Division

Football clubs in Indonesia
Football clubs in West Java
Association football clubs established in 1951
1951 establishments in Indonesia